Elysia Bolton (born 24 March 2000) is an Australian tennis player.

Bolton has a career high WTA singles ranking of 517 achieved on 2 August 2021. She also has a career high WTA doubles ranking of 230 achieved on 31 October 2022.

Bolton won her first major ITF title at the 2023 Canberra Clay Court International in the doubles draw partnering Alexandra Bozovic.

Bolton played college tennis at UCLA.

Career titles

Singles (1)

Doubles (5–4)

References

External links

2000 births
Living people
American female tennis players
Australian female tennis players
Sportspeople from Sydney
UCLA Bruins women's tennis players